The Annual LeMay Car Show began in 1978, as a small gathering with Harold and Nancy LeMay and friends.  The tradition continues to this day, with over 1,000 vintage cars shown on the last Saturday of August each year, and collectors coming to see them.  The yearly event is held at the LeMay Family Collection Foundation at Marymount in Tacoma, Washington, and the LeMays open up their home.  This event is not just about celebrating cars, though.  The staff and volunteers view this car show as a way of connecting people with history.  The past few years, an auction has also been part of the car show.

Feature Cars
Each year, the LeMay Car Show has had a car featured as the centerpiece of the show.

References

Auto shows in the United States